The 1927 Big Ten Conference football season was the 32nd season of college football played by the member schools of the Big Ten Conference (also known as the Western Conference) and was a part of the 1927 college football season.

The 1927 Illinois Fighting Illini football team, under head coach Robert Zuppke, compiled a 7–0–1 record, won the Big Ten championship, led the conference in scoring defense (3.0 points allowed per game), and was recognized as the national champion under the Dickinson System rankings. Guard Russ Crane and center Robert Reitsch received first-team All-American honors.

The 1927 Minnesota Golden Gophers football team, under head coach Clarence Spears, compiled a 6–0–2 record, led the Big Ten in scoring offense (26.1 points per game), and was ranked No. 3 in the Dickinson System rankings. Fullback Herb Joesting was a consensus first-team All-American, and guard Harold Hanson also received first-team All-American honors from multiple selectors.

The 1927 Michigan Wolverines football team, under head coach Tad Wieman, compiled a 6–2 record, shut out its first four opponents, and was ranked No. 7 in the Dickinson System rankings. Michigan end Bennie Oosterbaan was a consensus first-team All-American for the third consecutive year. Halfback Louis Gilbert was Michigan's leading scorer and a first-team All-Big Ten player.

Chicago center Ken Rouse received the Chicago Tribune Silver Football trophy as the most valuable player in the conference.

Season overview

Results and team statistics

Key
DS = Rankings from Dickinson System. See 1927 college football season
PPG = Average of points scored per game
PAG = Average of points allowed per game

Regular season

Bowl games
No Big Ten teams participated in any bowl games during the 1927 season.

All-Big Ten players

The following players were picked by the Associated Press (AP), the United Press (UP), the Chicago Daily News (CDN), and/or Walter Eckersall (WE) as first-team players on the 1927 All-Big Ten Conference football team.

All-Americans

Two Big Ten players were selected as consensus first-team players on the 1927 College Football All-America Team. They were:

Other Big Ten players received first-team honors from at least one selector. They were:

References